Fundy National Park is a national park of Canada located on the Bay of Fundy, near the village of Alma, New Brunswick. It was officially opened on 29 July 1950. The park showcases a rugged coastline which rises up to the Canadian Highlands, the highest tides in the world and more than 25 waterfalls. The park covers an area of  along Goose Bay, the northwestern branch of the Bay of Fundy. When one looks across the Bay, one can see the northern Nova Scotia coast.

At low tide, park visitors can explore the ocean floor where a variety of sea creatures (e.g., dog whelk, periwinkles, various seaweeds) cling to life. At high tide, the ocean floor disappears under  of salt water.

There are 25 hiking trails throughout the park. The Caribou Plains trail and boardwalk provides access to upland forest and bog habitats. Dickson Falls is the most popular trail in the park. During the winter, Fundy National Park is available for day use, at one's own risk. Visitors use the park to go cross-country skiing, snowshoeing, tobogganing, and winter walking. The cross-country ski trails are groomed by the local Chignecto Ski Club.

A variety of scientific projects are ongoing in the park, with the primary focus on monitoring the park's ecology. Recent projects have focused on re-establishing aquatic connectivity in the park (Bennett Lake Dam, new Culverts, Dickson Brook restoration. Species such as the endangered Inner Bay of Fundy Atlantic salmon, martens and fishers, brook trout, eel, and moose are monitored regularly.

The Dobson Trail and Fundy Footpath extend out of the park to Riverview and to St. Martins respectively. A unique red-painted covered bridge is located at Point Wolfe.

Other rivers that flow through the park include the:
Broad River
 Point Wolfe River
Upper Salmon River

Natural environment
According to the Commission for Environmental Cooperation, the park is located in the Level III- Eastern Temperate Forests (Maine-New Brunswick Plains and Hills) ecoregion. According to the Ecological Framework of Canada, the park is situated in two distinct ecoregions. The southern section of the park falls in the Fundy Coast ecoregion. This region experiences cool, wet summers and mild, rainy winters. Its coniferous forest consists of red spruce, balsam fir, and red maple with some white spruce, and white and yellow birch.  Some sugar maple and beech trees are also found here at higher elevations.  The northern section of the park falls in the Southern New Brunswick Uplands ecoregion. This ecoregion experiences summers that are warm and rainy, and winters that are mild and snowy. Its mixed-wood forest contains mainly sugar and red maple, white and red spruce and balsam fir trees.  Finally, according to the World Wide Fund for Nature, the park is located in the New England-Acadian forest ecoregion.

Flora 

The park is home to 658 species of vascular plants, 276 species of bryophytes, and more than 400 species of lichens. The Fundy forest is generally a mixed-wood forest composed of red spruce (Picea rubens), balsam fir (Abies balsamea), yellow birch (Betula alleghaniensis), white birch (Betulla papyrifera), sugar maple (Acer saccharum), and red maple (Acer rubrum). The mixed-wood forest floor is blanketed with moss, wood fern (Dryopteris), and bunchberry (Cornus canadensis).

Pure hardwood stands (distinguishable communities of tree species within a forest) account for 5.4% of the Fundy forest cover. The most abundant pure hardwood stands are yellow birch (Betula alleghaniensis) and white birch (Betulla papyrifera). There are also some sugar maple (Acer saccharum), red maple (Acer rubrum), and beech (Fagus) stands. Carolina springbeauty (Claytonia caroliniana) and trout-lily (Erythronium americanum) bloom in the hardwood forest every year.

The coniferous forest in the park represents the boreal element of Fundy's forest cover. Although pure stands of conifer are rare in the park, the Fundy forest has some of the last pure stands of red spruce (Picea rubens) found in eastern North America.

The bogs of the park are blanketed with sphagnum moss (Sphagnum) from which grow black spruce (Picea mariana) and Eastern larch (Larix laricina). Within the park's Caribou Plain bog, three carnivorous plant species are found: pitcher plant (Sarracenia purpurea), sundew (Drosera anglica), and bladderwort (Utricularia).

Some rare plant species are also found in the park. Bird's-eye primrose (Primula farinosa) is found along the Point Wolfe and Goose River coastal cliffs, and several other rare flora species, namely slender spikemoss (Selaginella viridissima), squashberry (Viburnum edule), green spleenwort (Asplenium viride), rare sedges, and fir clubmoss (Huperzia selago), are found along the eastern branch of the Point Wolfe River and the lower part of Bennett Brook.

Fauna
Animals that inhabit this national park are moose, snowshoe hares, chipmunks, cormorants, red squirrels, pileated woodpeckers, little brown bats, peregrine falcons, black bears, coyotes, beavers, white-tailed deer, white-winged crossbills, various mice and shrews, juncos, sandpipers, raccoons, warblers, plovers, great blue herons, and northern flying squirrels.

Tourism and administration
Located in Alma, New Brunswick, Fundy National Park is operated by Parks Canada an agency of the Government of Canada that is managed by Environment Canada. For the 2013-2014 fiscal year, Parks Canada plans to spend $693.7 million to manage its 44 national parks, 964 places of national historic significance, and 4 national marine conservation areas. Of these national historic sites, 167 are directly administered by Parks Canada.

Attendance
The park received 240,481 visitors during the 2012-2013 year; a decrease of 7% compared to 2011–2012. It is the most visited Parks Canada site in New Brunswick. Data from previous years reveal that 40% of people who camped at the park were from New Brunswick, 8% were from Nova Scotia or Prince Edward Island, and 52% were from outside the Maritimes. In 2005, visitors from outside of the Maritimes were 59% adult couples and 29% families; while visitors from the Maritimes were 67% families and 24% adult couples.

Amalgamation
The park includes several communities when it was expropriated including:
Hastings
Upper Salmon River
Butland Settlement

See also

 National Parks of Canada
 List of national parks of Canada
 List of parks in New Brunswick
 List of trails in New Brunswick
 List of mountains of New Brunswick
 List of waterfalls of New Brunswick
 List of beaches in New Brunswick

References

Gallery

External links
Official website

National parks in New Brunswick
Geography of Albert County, New Brunswick
Geography of Kings County, New Brunswick
Geography of Saint John County, New Brunswick
Protected areas established in 1948
Tourist attractions in Albert County, New Brunswick
Tourist attractions in Kings County, New Brunswick
Tourist attractions in Saint John County, New Brunswick
Beaches of New Brunswick
1948 establishments in New Brunswick
Canada geography articles needing translation from French Wikipedia